Hemirhagerrhis is a genus of snakes in the family Psammophiidae.

Geographic range
The genus Hemirhagerrhis is endemic to Africa.

Species
The genus Hemirhagerrhis contains four species which are recognized as being valid.
Hemirhagerrhis hildebrandtii 
Hemirhagerrhis kelleri 
Hemirhagerrhis nototaenia 
Hemirhagerrhis viperina 

Nota bene: A binomial authority in parentheses indicates that the species was originally described in a genus other than Hemirhagerrhis.

Etymology
The specific name, hildebrandtii, is in honor of German botanist Johann Maria Hildebrandt.

The specific name, kellerii, is in honor of Swiss naturalist Conrad Keller.

Reproduction
Snakes of the genus Hemirhagerrhis are oviparous.

References

Further reading
Boettger O (1893). "Übersicht der von Prof. C. Keller anlässlich der Ruspoli'schen Expedition nach den Somaliländern gesammelten Reptilien und Batrachier ". Zoologischer Anzeiger 16 (416): 113–119. (Hemirhagerrhis, new genus, p. 119). (in German).
Boulenger GA (1896). Catalogue of the Snakes in the British Museum (Natural History). Volume III., Containing the Colubridæ (Opisthoglyphæ and Proteroglyphæ) ... London: Trustees of the British Museum (Natural History). (Taylor and Francis, printers). xiv + 727 pp. + Plates I-XXV. (Genus Hemirhagerrhis, p. 119).
Branch, Bill (2004). Field Guide to Snakes and other Reptiles of Southern Africa. Sanibel Island, Florida: Ralph Curtis Books. 399 pp. . (Genus Hemirhagerrhis, pp. 85–86).

Hemirhagerrhis
Snake genera
Taxa named by Oskar Boettger